Southport Australian Football Club, nicknamed the Sharks, is an Australian rules football club based on the Gold Coast, Queensland, that competes in the Victorian Football League (VFL).

Southport is one of the most successful football clubs in Queensland, having claimed 22 senior-grade premierships across multiple competitions since it was established in 1961. It competed in the Gold Coast Australian Football League between 1961 and 1982, and then moved to the Queensland Australian Football League. In 2011 the club was elevated to the North East Australian Football League (NEAFL), before finally being accepted into the Victorian Football League following the NEAFL's cessation in 2019. Since 2020 Southport has fielded a senior women's team in Division 1 of the QAFLW competition; the club won its inaugural women's premiership in 2020.

History

Formation and early GCAFL years (1961–1982)
On 22 May 1961, the Southport Australian Football Club was formed and six days later the first training session was held at Labrador Sports Oval. It was revealed on 7 June 1961 that the club would be known on as the Southport Magpies and would wear a black and white vertical striped jumper similar to the Collingwood Football Club. In front of 1,000 spectators, Southport played their first ever game against Centrals Football Club on 25 June 1961. Southport came out victorious in their first outing 8.10.58 to Central's 6.11.47. They would then go on to win the first ever Gold Coast Australian Football League premiership with a 13-point victory over Ipswich on 25 September 1961.

With the expansion of the Gold Coast Australian Football League starting in 1962, Southport moved their home ground to Owen Park, Southport. Southport won back-to-back premierships in the first two years of the Gold Coast Australian Football League, defeating Currumbin by 53 points to win their second premiership. Following a series of local premierships, the club applied for entry into the Queensland Australian Football League in July 1981. Twelve months later, the Queensland Australian Football League officially accepted Southport's entry application for the 1983 season. In their last game as part of the Gold Coast Football League, the Southport Magpies fell in the Grand Final to Coolangatta by 28 points. The disappointment of the Grand Final loss was short lived as the rebranding from the Southport Magpies to the Southport Sharks began.  The strip was changed to a black V on a white background to avoid an identity conflict with the Sherwood Magpies, who later became the Western Magpies. The decision as to which club would retain the "Magpies" moniker was made by the toss of a coin.

New competitions (1983–)

Queensland Australian Football League (1983–1999)
Upon entrance into the Queensland Australian Football League (QAFL), the newly formed Southport Sharks were given little chance of success against the predominantly Brisbane based competition. In their first game of the 1983 season, the Sharks walked away winners with a victory over the Western Districts. They would compile a 12-6 win–loss record during the home and away season. The Sharks going undefeated through the 1983 finals series and would win the Grand Final by 13 points over Morningside. The Sharks would continue to prove themselves through the 80s with another three premierships added to their trophy cabinet as well as two runners-up. Early in 1989, the Sharks moved their headquarters to their current ground Fankhauser Reserve.

The club continued their dominance with an unbeaten season in 1990 but the club's financial woes were a big issue following a Grand Final loss in 1991. The club almost abandoned the QAFL late in 1991 to re-enter the Gold Coast Australian Football League, but Queensland's introduction of poker machines would secure the financial future of the Sharks. By 1995 the Sharks had reached 20,000 members began to lead the charge for a second Queensland team entering the Australian Football League.
In 1996, the Sharks made their first bid to the AFL for inclusion in the national league, which was rejected by the AFL in favour of the Port Adelaide Football Club's elevation from the SANFL.  After which, the club continued to lobby for a licence.

Following the AFL's rejection of the Sharks into the national league, the Sharks would set out to prove just how good they really were. The team would win three premierships in a row in 1997, 1998 and 1999 to finish off the millennium with success. In 1999 the Sharks were able to poach future St Kilda Saints star Nick Riewoldt from their cross-town rivals Broadbeach Cats, although Riewoldt would not compete for the Sharks senior side until 2000.

New Millennium and Dominance (2000–2010)
The Sharks would enter the 2000 season as the raging favourites to take out a fourth consecutive premiership. Soon to be number 1 AFL draft pick Nick Riewoldt would play a huge role in their Grand Final victory over the Northern Eagles. Riewoldt would be kept virtually touchless in the first half when matching up against future Brisbane Lions player Jamie Charman. Riewoldt was moved to ruck and would go on to kick two goals in the Sharks Grand Final victory. The four consecutive premierships would be Southport's last taste of success for five years as the club entered a rebuilding phase. Former AFL player Paul Dimattina pulled on the Sharks guernsey in 2005 and would lead the team to their first premiership in five years. The Sharks would continue their success with another three Grand Finals between 2006-2008 in which the Sharks would come away with two more premierships. In November 2010 it was announced the Sharks would be joining the newly formed North East Australian Football League which included four AFL reserves sides and local teams spread throughout Canberra, New South Wales, Northern Territory and Queensland.

North East Australian Football League (2011–2020)
The Sharks put together a 9–9 win–loss record in the 2011 NEAFL season but missed the finals series by percentage, their first non-finals season ever. The Sharks finished the 2012 NEAFL season with a 14–4 win–loss record and were placed third on the ladder. In the qualifying final, the Sharks fell to the Brisbane Lions reserves team but recorded their first NEAFL finals victory over Redland the following week. The Sharks faced the Northern Territory Thunder in the preliminary finals but lost by 37 points.

The club won its first and only NEAFL premiership in controversial circumstances in 2018, defeating Sydney reserves in the Grand Final. Southport dominated the game, and led 12.4 (76) to 2.4 (16) at three-quarter time, but then accidentally sent nineteen men onto the field to start the final quarter. Sydney called for a head count after twenty seconds and the extra man was discovered, which would traditionally have resulted in Southport's score being re-set to zero for the final quarter; however, officials determined that since the breach had an immaterial effect on the game, Southport would retain its score and the only penalty would be a free kick and fifty metre penalty, resulting in one Sydney goal. Southport went on to win 14.6 (90) to 5.5. (35).

Victorian Football League (2021–)
Following the cessation of the NEAFL in 2020 during the COVID-19 pandemic, Southport were granted entry into an expanded Victorian Football League for the 2021 season. The Sharks  found success quickly in the VFL by compiling a 9-1 record throughout the 2021 season and qualified for the finals in second position on the ladder but were unable to compete any further due to the August–October Victorian COVID-19 lockdown. Southport continued their dominance in the 2022 VFL season by winning 13 of 18 games and became the first Queensland-based club to qualify for the VFL Grand Final where they were defeated by the Casey Demons at Ikon Park.

Rivalries

Broadbeach Cats
One of the most intense rivalries in local Queensland football exists between the neighbouring clubs in the form of the Sharks and the Broadbeach Cats and stretches back to their first meeting in 1971. Matches between the two teams generally result in a larger audience and a heated contest on the field. As of the completion of the 2013 NEAFL season, the win–loss record between the two clubs stands at 70-10 in favour of the Sharks. The Cats were removed from the North East Australian Football League at the conclusion of the 2013 season which has resulted in the rivalry not continuing at the senior level.

Gold Coast Suns
Matches between Southport and the Gold Coast Suns are often referred to as the Coast Clash and have occurred on a regular basis since 2011 when both teams entered the North East Australian Football League. The first ever competitive match that the Suns competed in took place in March 2009 against a reigning 2008 QAFL premiership Southport team and the Sharks would win the encounter 6.3 (39) to 3.5 (23) at Carrara Stadium. The two teams met in a 2022 VFL preliminary final and despite losing eight straight times to the Suns leading into the match, Southport came out victorious 14.25 (109) to 13.3 (81) at Fankhauser Reserve.

Premierships (22)

Club song
The Southport Sharks club song was sung to the tune of Goodbye Dolly Gray.

Grogan Medallists 

Peter Guy – 1983
Zane Taylor – 1985
Jason Cotter – 1990 / 1993
David Crutchfield – 1992
Chris O'Sullivan – 1992
David Bain – 1995 / 1999
Jeff Brennan – 1997
David Round – 2002
Danny Wise - 2010
Matthew Payne - 2011
Fraser Pope - 2012
Haydn Kiel - 2013

QAFL Top Goalkickers
R. McKay (85) – 1998
R. McKay (66) – 1999
R. McKay (79) – 2000
B. McEntee (119) – 2004
B. McEntee (84) – 2005
B. McEntee (100) – 2007
B. McEntee (66) – 2008

Drafted players in the AFL/VFL

AFL/VFL players
There are list of past and present Southport players who have played at AFL/VFL:

 Jack Anthony (Collingwood and Fremantle)
 Marcus Ashcroft (Brisbane Bears and Brisbane Lions)
 David Bain (Brisbane Bears and Fitzroy)
 Adrian Bassett (Carlton)
 Dayne Beams (Collingwood and Brisbane Lions)
 Corey Bell (Brisbane Bears)
 Nathan Bock (Adelaide and Gold Coast)
 Andrew Boston (Gold Coast)
 Jared Brennan (Brisbane Lions and Gold Coast)
 Warwick Capper (Sydney Swans and Brisbane Bears)
 Darren Carlson (Brisbane Bears)
 David Crutchfield (1965–2002) (Fitzroy)
 Ian Dargie (St. Kilda and West Coast Eagles)
 Gary Dempsey (Footscray and North Melbourne)
 Paul Dimattina (Western Bulldogs)
 Sam Gilbert (St. Kilda)
 Stuart Glascott (Brisbane Bears)
 Brent Green (1976–2009) (Brisbane Bears, Brisbane Lions and Sydney Swans)
 Steven Handley (Geelong)
 Wally Hillis (1938–2006) (Richmond)
 Josh Hunt (Geelong and GWS)
 Matthew Kennedy (Brisbane Bears and Brisbane Lions)
 Trent Knobel (Brisbane Lions, St. Kilda and Richmond)
 Eddie Lake (Essendon)

 Steven Lawrence (Brisbane Bears, Brisbane Lions and St. Kilda)
 Broc McCauley (Brisbane Lions and Hawthorn)
 Steven McLuckie (Brisbane Bears)
 Daniel Merrett (Brisbane Lions)
 Glen Middlemiss (Geelong and St. Kilda)
 Wayde Mills (Brisbane Lions)
 Brad Moran (North Melbourne and Adelaide)
 Chris O'Sullivan (Brisbane Bears)
 Andrew Raines (Richmond, Brisbane Lions and Gold Coast)
 Brent Renouf (Hawthorn and Port Adelaide)
 Nick Riewoldt (St. Kilda)
 David Round (Western Bulldogs)
 Bill Ryan (Geelong)
 Leigh Ryswyk (Brisbane Lions)
 Ray Sarcevic (Geelong)
 Zane Taylor (Geelong)
 Rory Thompson (Gold Coast)
 Joel Tippett (Gold Coast and North Melbourne)
 Kurt Tippett (Adelaide and Sydney Swans)
 Lachie Weller (Fremantle)
 Pat Wellington (1953–1987) (Essendon)
 Jesse White (Sydney Swans and Collingwood)
 Joshua Williams (North Melbourne)
 Marc Woolnough (Geelong)
 Billy Gowers (Carlton and Western Bulldogs)
  Brad Lynch (Western Bulldogs)
 Lukas Webb (Western Bulldogs)

Season Results

References

External links

 
 Southport Sharks History

Southport
Victorian Football League clubs
Southport, Queensland
1961 establishments in Australia
Australian rules football clubs established in 1961
Australian rules football teams on the Gold Coast, Queensland